Chula Vista Resort is a southwestern-themed waterpark resort in Wisconsin Dells, Wisconsin.

History
Chula Vista has been in existence since the late 19th century, when there was only one vacation home on the Wisconsin River. In the 1920s, the Berry Family purchased the home and built Berry's Coldwater Canyon Hotel and Berry's Dells Golf Course. Joe and Vera Kaminski became innkeepers at the hotel in 1952, and later purchased the entire complex from the Berry Family.

Chula Vista is currently run by Tim and Mike Kaminski, who are the grandsons of Joe and Vera. The resort was renamed to Chula Vista Theme Resort, and a new main hotel building was constructed, along with a new outdoor pool area.

In the 1990s, Chula Vista added a  outdoor waterpark and a 30,000 indoor waterpark (which has been closed since 2008 due to the opening of the Lost Rios Indoor Waterpark).

2006 Expansion
In 2006, Chula Vista Theme Resort dropped the "Theme" from its name, becoming just Chula Vista Resort. This expansion turned Chula Vista into one of the premier waterpark resorts in the Wisconsin Dells and became one of the largest resorts in the Dells at 620 rooms.

Lost Rios Indoor Waterpark

 Opened in 2006
 80,000 sq ft. multilevel indoor waterpark
 Fly'n Mayan (2006), WhiteWater Zip Coaster
 635 ft long
 One of two WhiteWater Zip Coasters ever built and last one in existence
 Kalahari Sandusky closed theirs in 2020
 Matador Mat Racers (2006), WhiteWater Whizzard
 Python Plunge (2006), WhiteWater Speed Slide
 Emerald Express (2006), WhiteWater Tube Slide
 Ruby Run (2006), WhiteWater Tube Slide
 Jungle Adventure (2006), WhiteWater SuperBowl
 Mount Montezuma’s Mayan Temple (2006), WhiteWater AquaPlay
 Rio Rapids Action River (2006)
 Croc Walk Water Crossing (2006)
 Incatinka Kiddie Play Area (2006)
 Lava Lagoon Activity Pool (2006)
 Jacuzzi Hot Tub (2006)

Adventure Lagoon Outdoor Waterpark

 120,000 square-foot outdoor waterpark
 Opened in 1992
 The Cyclone (2008),  Waterfun Products Aquawiz Vortex
 Replaced Gator Tail
 Durango Drop (2002), Waterfun Products Jetstream Speed Slide
 Adventure Lagoon Body Flumes (2000), Proslide
 Rattlesnake Run, Proslide Twister
 The Sidewinder, Proslide Kidz
 The Chute, Proslide Kidz
 Switchback Canyon (2002), Waterfun Products Sidewinder MK-I
 Red Rock Racer (2002), Waterfun Products Surfhill Racer
 Wave Pool (2004)
 Cactus Cove 
 Adventure Lagoon
 Sulfur Springs
 Former Attractions
 Gator Tail (2002), Waterfun Products Backlash

Coyote Mountain Indoor Waterpark

 30,000 square foot indoor waterpark
 Built in 1998 and closed in 2008
 Canyon Rock Ruin (1998), Proslide Kidz Twister
 Coyote Mountain (1998), Two Proslide Kidz Twisters
 Cougar Crossing (1998), water walk activity pool
 El Nino (1998), Children's play area and wading pool
 Forgotten Falls (1998), hot tub
 Water Basketball (1998)

Wisconsin Dells Center
In 2007, Chula Vista constructed a new sports dome just south of the resort complex. It is home to many sports finals and events in Wisconsin and the Midwest. Also, concerts, indoor football, and trade shows take place at the Wisconsin Dells Center.

References

External links
Chula Vista Resort

Wisconsin Dells, Wisconsin
Water parks in Wisconsin
Resorts in Wisconsin